Marengo Community High School is a public high school located in southwestern McHenry County, Illinois, that serves the communities of Marengo and Union, as well as the surrounding rural areas.  The school has an enrollment of approximately 700 students.

References

Notable alumni
Ken Dunek, former NFL and USFL tight end

External links

Marengo Community High School website

Schools in McHenry County, Illinois
Education in McHenry County, Illinois
Public high schools in Illinois